These are the partial results of the 1973 Central American and Caribbean Championships in Athletics which took place between July 26 and 29, 1973 in Maracaibo, Venezuela.

Men's results

100 meters

Heats – July 26

Final – July 26

200 meters
July 28Wind: +4.1 m/s

400 meters

Heats – July 26

Final – July 27

800 meters

Heats – July 26

Final – July 27

1500 meters
July 29

5000 meters
July 27

10,000 meters
July 26

Half marathon
July 29

110 meters hurdles
July 28Wind: +3.9 m/s

400 meters hurdles
July 27

3000 meters steeplechase
July 28

4 × 100 meters relay
July 29

4 × 400 meters relay
July 29

High jump
July 29

Pole vault
July 28

Long jump
July 26

Triple jump
July 28

Shot put
July 27

Discus throw
July 26

Hammer throw
July 29

Javelin throw
July 28

Decathlon
July 28–29

Women's results

100 meters
July 26

200 meters
July 27Wind: +2.9 m/s

400 meters
July 28

800 meters
July 28

1500 meters
July 29

100 meters hurdles
July 28

200 meters hurdles
July 27

4 × 100 meters relay
July 29

4 × 400 meters relay
July 29

High jump
July 26

Long jump
July 26

Shot put
July 26

Discus throw

Javelin throw
July 27

Pentathlon
July 27

References

Central American and Caribbean Championships
Events at the Central American and Caribbean Championships in Athletics